Kandukuri (Telugu: కందుకూరి) is one of the Indian surnames.
 Kandukuri Veeresalingam  was a social reformer of Andhra Pradesh.
 Kandukuri Kareembasha better known as Sadguru Sivananda Murty, is a well-known Indian scholar and a humanist, who writes about Indian heritage and culture, spirituality and philosophy.
 Kandukuri Bala Surya Prasada Rao, was the Zaminder of Urlam Samsthanam.

Indian surnames